Jordan Larmour is a professional rugby union player for 
Leinster and 
Ireland. 
He normally plays at wing or fullback.

Early life
Larmour was born in Dublin, Ireland. He attended St. Andrews College, where he played both rugby and hockey. Towards the end of his school years, Larmour focused on rugby.

Club career
Larmour joined St Mary's College RFC after finishing school and was in the Leinster Rugby academy . In January 2018, at the age of 20, Leinster signed him to a senior contract.

National team
Larmour was called up to the senior Ireland squad for the 2018 Six Nations Championship.
He made his Ireland debut on 10 February 2018 when he came on as a replacement in 45th minute of the 56-19 win against Italy in week two of the 2018 Six Nations Championship. 
In November 2018 Larmour played against Italy in Chicago. He scored 3 tries and won the man of the match award.

Honours

Ireland
Six Nations Championship:
Winner (1): 2018	
Grand Slam:
Winner (1): 2018
Triple Crown:
Winner (1): 2018

Leinster
European Rugby Champions Cup:
Winner (1): 2018
Runner up (1): 2019
Pro14:
Winner (4): 2018, 2019, 2020, 2021

Individual
World Rugby Breakthrough Player of the Year (Nominated): 1 (2018)
Pro14 Team of the Year: 1 (2018)
Pro14 Young Player of the Year: 1 (2018)
European Cup Player of the Year (Nominated): 1 (2020)

References

External links

Leinster Profile
Ireland Profile
Pro14 Profile

1997 births
Living people
St Mary's College RFC players
Leinster Rugby players
Irish rugby union players
Ireland international rugby union players
Rugby union players from Dublin (city)
Irish male field hockey players
Field hockey players from County Dublin
Monkstown Hockey Club players
People educated at St Andrew's College, Dublin
Rugby union wings
Rugby union fullbacks